The 1967–68 European Cup was the 13th European Cup, UEFA's premier club football tournament. The competition was won by Manchester United, who beat Benfica 4–1 in the final at Wembley Stadium, London. The European Cup title marked the tenth year since the Munich air disaster, in which eight United players were killed and their manager, Matt Busby, was left close to death, the day after earning a place in the semi-finals of the 1957–58 competition. It was also the first time an English side had won the trophy.

The away goals rule (which had already been used in the Cup Winners' Cup and the Fairs' Cup) was introduced if aggregate scores were level after two legs, but only for the first round of the competition. Extra time goals were not included in the rule.

Celtic, the defending champions, were eliminated by Dynamo Kyiv in the first round.

Bracket

First round

|}

First leg

Second leg

Sarajevo won 5–3 on aggregate.

Manchester United won 4–0 on aggregate.

Dynamo Kyiv won 3–2 on aggregate.

Górnik Zabrze won 4–0 on aggregate.

Hvidovre won 5–4 on aggregate.

Real Madrid won 3–2 on aggregate.

Sparta Prague won 2–1 on aggregate.

Anderlecht won 5–2 on aggregate.

Vasas won 9–1 on aggregate.

4–4 on aggregate; Valur won on away goals.

1–1 on aggregate; Benfica won on away goals.

Saint-Étienne won 5–0 on aggregate.

Rapid Wien won 4–0 on aggregate.

Juventus won 2–0 on aggregate.

Rapid București won 3–2 on aggregate.

Second round

|}

First leg

Second leg

Manchester United won 2–1 on aggregate.

Górnik Zabrze won 3–2 on aggregate.

Real Madrid won 6–3 on aggregate.

Sparta Prague won 6–5 on aggregate.

Vasas won 11–1 on aggregate.

Benfica won 2–1 on aggregate.

Eintracht Braunschweig won 2–1 on aggregate.

Juventus won 1–0 on aggregate.

Quarter-finals

|}

1 Juventus beat Eintracht Braunschweig 1–0 in a play-off to reach the semi-finals.

First leg

Second leg

Manchester United won 2–1 on aggregate.

Real Madrid won 4–2 on aggregate.

Benfica won 3–0 on aggregate.

Juventus 3–3 Eintracht Braunschweig on aggregate.

Juventus won 1–0 in a play-off.

Semi-finals

|}

First leg

Second leg

Manchester United won 4–3 on aggregate.

Benfica won 3–0 on aggregate.

Final

Top scorers

References

External links
1967–68 All matches – season at UEFA website
 European Cup results at Rec.Sport.Soccer Statistics Foundation
 All scorers 1967–68 European Cup according to protocols UEFA
 1967-68 European Cup - results and line-ups (archive)
 European Cup 1967-68 – results, protocols, players statistics
 website eurocups-uefa.ru European Cup 1967-68 – results, protocols
 website Football Archive 1967–68 European Cup

1967–68 in European football
European Champion Clubs' Cup seasons